Loxozona is a genus of moths in the subfamily Arctiinae. The genus was erected by George Hampson in 1898.

Species
 Loxozona lanceolata Walker, 1854
 Loxozona nitens Rothschild, 1912

References

External links

Arctiinae